"Piece of My Heart" is a song co-written and performed by American contemporary R&B singer Tara Kemp, issued as the second single from her eponymous debut album. The song was her second consecutive Top 10 hit on the Billboard Hot 100, peaking at #7 in 1991.

Chart positions

Weekly charts

Year-end charts

References

External links
 
 

1990 songs
1991 singles
Tara Kemp songs
Giant Records (Warner) singles
Songs written by Tara Kemp